"Feet Up (Pat Him on the Po-Po)" is a popular song written by Bob Merrill in 1952.  Its best-known version was recorded by Guy Mitchell in 1952.  The song reached number 18 on the Cashbox chart in August 1952.  The song also reached number 2 on the UK Singles Chart in November 1952, becoming the first number two record in that chart.

The narrator of the song is a former lowlife who is reforming so he can set a good example for his newborn son, whom he loves.  The title refers to the tradition of spanking a newborn baby just after birth, to ensure it draws breath.

References

Songs written by Bob Merrill
1952 songs
Guy Mitchell songs